Sea switch is a book written by Linda Joy Singleton about a mermaid who wishes to get out of her punishment by switching bodies with a girl named Cassie.  The book was published on September 1, 2005 as the third part of the Strange Encounters book series.

The book is 254 pages long.

Main characters 

Cassie – Cassie has a dark secret about her past that no person knows about besides her brother. Her best friend was an alien but when she swaps body with a criminal she has new problems to deal with.
Rosalie- is Cassie's friend who has no clue that her best friend was an alien or any of the other supernatural events but she is also the cause of Cassie losing her body to an evil mermaid.
Galena- A mermaid who had caused mayhem and tricked Cassie into a body swap so Cassie would be punished for her destruction instead of Galena.
Lucas- Lucas is Cassie's older brother. He also knows some of Cassie's darkest secrets of the past.
Cassie's parent's – her mother is a naturalist and her father is a t.v star.
Amber – Amber is Cassie's younger sister. She also is obsessed with pets.

Publisher 
The book was published by Llewellyn Publications.

Summary plot 
Cassie and her family go to Oregon for a beach cleanup expedition. Cassie invites her friend Rosalie to come on the vacation. Cassie was planning on telling him she had hung out with aliens and about playing magical games in a secret underground community. Rosalie and Cassie hang out with each other at first but Rosalie ditches Cassie while they were playing volley ball. Later while Cassie is strolling down the beach she meets a mermaid named Galena and she talks to Cassie about the problems Cassie is having and her anger. Galena gives Cassie a necklace with an evil spell on it which forces Cassie into a body swap. The next thing she knew she was trapped in Galena's body. When she is rescued by a merman Cassie realises that the body she is hosting has caused a lot of destruction and chaos. Cassie tries to convince them she is not Galena. She chooses to be on probation instead of jail although some people begin to think that her protests might not be all lies. Will she be stuck in Galena's body forever or will she switch back to normal?

External links 

2005 American novels
American young adult novels